Lipotropic compounds are those that help catalyse the breakdown of fat during metabolism in the body. A lipotropic nutrient promotes or encourages the export of fat from the liver. Lipotropics are necessary for maintenance of a healthy liver, and for burning the exported fat for additional energy. Without lipotropics, such as choline and inositol, fats and bile can become trapped in the liver, causing severe problems such as cirrhosis and blocking fat metabolism.

Choline is the major lipotrope in mammals and other known lipotropes are important only insofar as they contribute to the synthesis of choline. Choline is essential for fat metabolism. Choline functions as a methyl donor and it is required for proper liver function. Though choline can be synthesized from methionine or serine, mammals don't produce a sufficient amount on their own. Liver, eggs, wheat bran, meat, and broccoli are dietary sources of choline.

Inositol exerts lipotropic effects as well. An "unofficial" member of the B vitamins, inositol has even been shown to relieve depression and panic attacks. Oranges and cantaloupe are high in inositol.

Methionine, an essential amino acid, is a major lipotropic compound in humans. When estrogen levels are high, the body requires more methionine. Estrogens reduce bile flow through the liver and increase bile cholesterol levels. Methionine helps deactivate estrogens. Egg whites are high in methionine.

Methionine levels also affect the amount of sulfur-containing compounds, such as glutathione, in the liver. Glutathione and other sulfur-containing peptides play a critical role in defending against toxic compounds. Supplementation with vitamin C, vitamin D, and NAC can increase glutathione levels.

Betaine hydrochloride is a powerful lipotropic and increases gastric acid. Betaine itself (in a non-hydrochloric form, also known as TMG or Trimethylglycine) also has a lipotropic effect. Quinoa is high in betaine.

Oxibetaine is another agent listed as a lipotropic compound.

References

Further reading
 

Metabolism